The Baltimore Light RailLink network consists of a main north-south line that serves 28 of the system's 33 stops; a spur in Baltimore city that connects a single stop (Penn Station) to the main line; and two branches at the south end of the line that serve two stops apiece. Because of the track arrangement, trains can only enter the Penn Station spur from the mainline heading north and leave it heading south; there are still single-track sections north of Fairgrounds, limiting headways in that section to 15 minutes.

Main Line

Branch to BWI Airport

Branch to Glen Burnie

Penn Station line

External links

The MTA's Light Rail page
Scott Kozel's Baltimore Light Rail pages

 
Baltimore Light Rail
Baltimore Light Rail
Light Rail
Baltimore Light Rail